History Cold Case is a British documentary television series in which scientists use modern forensic techniques to investigate ancient remains. Two series of History Cold Case aired on BBC Two between 6 May 2010 and 21 July 2011. The television series is recommended for age 17 and above due to graphic images and maturity.

Overview
Anthropologist Sue Black and her team at the Centre for Anatomy & Human Identification (CAHID) at the University of Dundee investigate human remains. They use forensic science, including radiocarbon dating, DNA and isotope analysis, to find out about the life and death of each set of remains, which range in date from the Bronze Age to the Victorian era. In some cases, they search through historic records to try to locate a name. In each episode, the team travels to a different location in Great Britain and set up a mobile lab to do their work. At the conclusion, they present their findings, including facial reconstruction, to the local community.

Cast
Sue Black, forensic anthropologist
Xanthé Mallett, forensic anthropologist and criminologist
Caroline Wilkinson, anthropologist who creates facial reconstructions
Wolfram Meier-Augenstein, expert in isotope analysis (series 1)

Episodes

Series 1 (2010)

Series 2 (2011)

See also
Forensic archaeology
Time Team
Cold Case Files

References

External links 
 
 

BBC reality television shows
2010 British television series debuts
2011 British television series endings
British documentary television series
Television series by Endemol
English-language television shows
Archaeology of the United Kingdom